The Joe Marston Medal is an A-League award given to the player of the match in the A-League Grand Final each year. Introduced in 1990, previously the award was also given to the best player in the National Soccer League grand final. The medal is named after Joe Marston, who played for Australia national association football team in the 1950s and was a member of the Preston North End side that played in the 1954 FA Cup Final.

List of winners

NSL

 *Player on the losing team

Multiple winners

See also
 John Kosmina Medal
 Johnny Warren Medal
 Mark Viduka Medal
Michael Cockerill Medal

References

External links
 Oz Football – NSL Individual Award Winners

National Soccer League (Australia)
Australian soccer trophies and awards
A-League Men Grand Finals